Floridia (from Latin  "day of Flora" or the adjective floridus "florid") is a town and comune in the Province of Syracuse, Sicily (Italy).

Geography
Its principal industries are agriculture, livestock, and manufacturing.

Neighboring communities are Canicattini Bagni, Palazzolo Acreide, Syracuse, and Solarino.

Climate

History
Floridia was founded in 1628.

Main sights

Floridia's streets are laid out in an even, rectangular grid pattern.  The main landmarks are:
San Bartolomeo Apostolo: mother church of town
Sant'Antonio: church 
Santa Anna: church
Chiesa del Carmine: church whose façade was greatly damaged by 1908 Messina earthquake, but has since been restored
Chiesa della Madonna delle Grazie: church erected by the Spanish after their victory over the Austrians
San Francesco: church 
Cava di Spampinato, a rock formation of crevices and caves that were created by erosion
Casa di Ranieri, the home and religious site where many believers pray to the God of Rain each year

Notable people born or raised in Floridia 
Notable residents and historical figures include:
 Lucia Migliaccio (b. 1770 d. 1826) - Duchess of Floridia

References

Municipalities of the Province of Syracuse